Hayden Jolly (born 4 April 1992) is a former professional Australian rules footballer who played for the Gold Coast Football Club in the Australian Football League (AFL).

External links

Hayden Jolly player profile, Gold Coast Suns

1992 births
Living people
Gold Coast Football Club players
Glenelg Football Club players
Australian rules footballers from South Australia